Matthew James LaBounty (born January 3, 1969) is a former American football player who played defensive end in the National Football League. He now lives in Eugene with his wife, Kelly Blair LaBounty (Former Assistant Track and Field coach for the University of Oregon and former Olympian) and sons, Jacob and Lucas.

Since 2009, LaBounty has worked at Thurston High School, in Springfield, Oregon, as a wood shop teacher.

References

1969 births
Living people
American football defensive ends
San Francisco 49ers players
Green Bay Packers players
Seattle Seahawks players
Oregon Ducks football players
Ed Block Courage Award recipients